Abdul Najeeb Qureshi (born ) is an Indian sprinter from Hyderabad. Najeeb, along with Anil Kumar Prakash, jointly held the 100 metres Indian national record of 10.30, before it being broken by Amiya Kumar Mallick.

On 6 October 2010, Qureshi equalled the national 100 m record while qualifying for the semi-finals during the 2010 Commonwealth Games held at New Delhi, India. He clocked 10.30 s to equal Anil Kumar Prakash's national record set in 2005 at the National Circuit Athletic Meet held in New Delhi. Qureshi was also part of India's 4x100 relay team that won the bronze medal at the 2010 Commonwealth Games. The team set a new national record of 38.89s.

Qureshi also won 200 m sprint at the South Asian Games held at Dhaka, Bangladesh in February 2010.

He completed his schooling from Defence Laboratories School, Kanchanbagh, Hyderabad. At school, his inherent talent in running was identified by his coach Adarsh Goswami. He encouraged Najeeb to participate in the CBSE meet.

During the Guangzhou Asian Games - 2010, he lost his bronze medal by just a hundredth of a second.

References

External links

Profile at All-athletics.com

Living people
1988 births
Indian Muslims
Indian male sprinters
Sportspeople from Hyderabad, India
Commonwealth Games bronze medallists for India
Commonwealth Games medallists in athletics
Athletes (track and field) at the 2010 Commonwealth Games
Athletes (track and field) at the 2010 Asian Games
South Asian Games gold medalists for India
Asian Games competitors for India
South Asian Games medalists in athletics
Medallists at the 2010 Commonwealth Games